Headsex is the first album by Technohead, a pseudonym of the duo Greater Than One, released in 1995.  It is the album from which the single "I Wanna Be a Hippy" was taken, which peaked at number six in the UK Singles Chart in February 1996.  The song quotes several lines from artist/activist David Peel's song "I Like Marijuana"

Track listing

 "I Wanna Be a Hippy" (original mix) (5:03)
 "Headsex (Let the Music Go)" (Nanotech mix) (4:22) (vocals by Jessica Ogden)
 "Accelerator #2" (4:40)
 "The Passion #1" (5:29)
 "Get High" (G.T.O. mix) (5:19) (remix by GTO)
 "Mary Jane" (4:59)
 "Headsex" (original mix) (4:19)
 "Get Stoned" (Carl Cox mix) (7:08) (remix by Carl Cox)
 "Keep the Party Going" (4:24)
 "Sexhead" (Daz Saund & Trevor Rockcliffe mix) (4:52) (remix by Daz Saund and Trevor Rockcliffe)
 "Gabba Hop" (5:04)
 "Kiddie Mix" (4:11)
 "Headsex (Let the Music Go)" (Elvis Jackson radio mix) (2:52) (remix by Elvis Jackson, vocals by Jessica Ogden)
 "I Wanna Be a Hippy" (Flamman & Abraxas radio mix) (3:35)

References

1995 debut albums